Pniewo  is a village in the administrative district of Gmina Łomża, within Łomża County, Podlaskie Voivodeship, in north-eastern Poland.

The village has a population of 750.

History
After the joint German-Soviet invasion of Poland, which started World War II, the village was occupied by the Soviet Union from 1939 to 1941, and then by Nazi Germany from 1941 to 1944. In 1942–1943, the Germans massacred around 400 Poles and Jews in the Pniewo forest. There is a memorial at the site.

People born in Pniewo 
 Teodor Szybiłło (b. 1873, d. 1937?) - a Polish politician and member of the Legislative Sejm (1919-1922).

References

Pniewo
Nazi war crimes in Poland